Betzweiler-Wälde is a former municipality, now part of Loßburg, in the district of Freudenstadt in Baden-Württemberg in Germany.

Towns in Baden-Württemberg
Freudenstadt (district)